Sebastian Thormann (born 21 February 1976 in Wermelskirchen) is a German rower.

References
 

1976 births
Living people
Rowers at the 2004 Summer Olympics
Olympic rowers of Germany
World Rowing Championships medalists for Germany
German male rowers